Estadio Borregos, also referred to as Estadio Banorte for sponsorship reasons, is a multi-purpose stadium in Monterrey, Mexico. It is the home stadium for the college football team Borregos Salvajes Monterrey of the ONEFA and the professional American football team Fundidores de Monterrey from the Liga de Fútbol Americano Profesional. The stadium was inaugurated in April 2019 and seats 10,057 spectators.

In March 2021, Mexican bank Banorte was announced as the stadiums's main sponsor.

History
Following the demolition of the Estadio Tecnológico in 2017, after their main tenants, C.F. Monterrey moved to the Estadio BBVA, the Monterrey Institute of Technology and Higher Education (ITESM), owner and operator of the stadium, decided to built a new stadium with smaller capacity to host their sports teams, mainly the American football and association football squads.

The stadium broke ground in 2017 and was inaugurated on 30 April 2019 with an event that involved the student community of the ITESM.

On 3 May 2019, Borregos Salvajes played their first American football game against the UBC Thunderbirds, winning 24–17.

Fundidores de Monterrey moved to the stadium for the LFA 2020 season from the Estadio Nuevo León Unido, which could only accommodate 1,500 people.

The stadium also hosted Parrilleros de Monterrey of the Fútbol Americano de México league during 2022 on the team's only season, since the league dissolved on September 2022.

Facilities
The stadium is part of the Centro Deportivo Borregos, a sports complex within the Monterrey Institute of Technology and Higher Education campus, that also includes: a smaller stadium with capacity of 2,000 spectators, a track and field stadium, a multi-use
field, two grass fields, two fast football fields, one flag football field and one turf football field.

Estadio Borregos has six dressing rooms for players and two for referees, a fully equipped gymnasium a physiotherapy room and an athlete lounge.

Concerts
The stadium hosted Dua Lipa's Future Nostalgia Tour in September 2022. It will host Muse's Will of the People World Tour in January 2023

References

College American football venues in Mexico
American football venues in Mexico
2019 establishments in Mexico
Sports venues completed in 2019
Monterrey Institute of Technology and Higher Education